Franck N'Dri (born 9 January 1997) is an Ivorian rower. He competed in the 2020 Summer Olympics.

References

1997 births
Living people
Sportspeople from Abidjan
Rowers at the 2020 Summer Olympics
Ivorian male rowers
Olympic rowers of Ivory Coast